Wycombe may refer to the following places:

Australia 
Wycombe, Queensland, a locality in the Maranoa REgion
High Wycombe, Western Australia, a suburb of Perth

United Kingdom 
High Wycombe, Buckinghamshire, England
Wycombe District, a local government district 
Wycombe Rural District, a former local government district
Wycombe (UK Parliament constituency)

United States 
 Wycombe, Pennsylvania, a village in Wrightstown Township, United States

See also
Wickham (disambiguation)
Wykeham (disambiguation)
Wycomb, Leicestershire, England